Jacobsburg Environmental Education Center is a  Pennsylvania state park near Wind Gap, in Bushkill Township, Northampton County in Pennsylvania. The Jacobsburg National Historic District is almost entirely surrounded by the park. Jacobsburg Environmental Education Center is just off the Belfast exit of Pennsylvania Route 33.

Environmental Education
The main purpose of Jacobsburg Environmental Education Center  is to provide environmental education for the citizens of Pennsylvania and specifically the students of the nearby elementary schools, high schools, colleges, and universities. Jacobsburg stays busy offering hands on opportunities to these students and their teachers with a "discovery and problem solving" approach.

Jacobsburg National Historic District
The Jacobsburg National Historic District is the location of the Henry Homestead. The district includes 11 contributing buildings and 34 contributing sites. Along with the staff of the Jacobsburg Historical Society the center provides a heritage education program, with classes in gunmaking and blacksmithing.  Rendezvous and period military encampments are included in the center's Living History program.  The Pennsylvania Longrifle Heritage Museum is located in the Henry Homestead.

The Henry family had a long history of rifle making going back before the French and Indian War.William Henry opened his first gun factory in Lancaster in 1750. During the French and Indian war he was an armorer for the Braddock Campaign of 1755 and the Forbes Expedition of 1758. His son William Henry II established a small gunmaking shop in Christian Springs in 1778. He moved his operation to Jacobsburg in 1792. Soon he built an iron forge to provide the needed iron to manufacture his rifles at Jacobsburg. The War of 1812 lead to an increase in demand, and Henry II built a second and larger factory in Boulton. The Henry family continued manufacturing rifles for three generations.

Ecology
Jacobsburg Environmental Education Center is home to the only remaining old-growth forest in the Lehigh Valley. The Henry's Woods section of the park is a largely virgin forest. Ecologists note the lack of large eastern white pines in what is otherwise a stand of old growth deciduous trees and eastern hemlock. The trees are up to 130 feet in height.

Recreation
The walking bridge adjacent to the main parking lot was destroyed in 2004 during a flood caused by Hurricane Frances, but was replaced in 2008. The center provides an environmental education program, with classes in natural history. The center is known for its diversity of wildflowers that are especially striking during springtime. There is a heritage education program at Jacobsburg Environmental Education Center. This program displays and demonstrates early gunmaking practices. A living history program includes a mid-1840s rendezvous and military re-enactments. Blacksmith and gunsmith classes are offered and the historic buildings are open for tours.

The most common game species are squirrels, pheasants, rabbits and white-tailed deer. The hunting of groundhogs is prohibited. Hunters are expected to follow the rules and regulations of the Pennsylvania Game Commission.

Bushkill Creek is stocked with trout by the Pennsylvania Fish and Boat Commission.

Nearby state parks

The following state parks are within  of Jacobsburg Environmental Education Center:
Beltzville State Park (Carbon County)
Big Pocono State Park (Monroe County)
Bull's Island Recreation Area (New Jersey)
Delaware and Raritan Canal State Park (New Jersey)
Delaware Canal State Park (Bucks and Northampton counties)
Gouldsboro State Park (Monroe and Wayne counties)
Hacklebarney State Park (New Jersey)
Hickory Run State Park (Carbon County)
Lehigh Gorge State Park (Carbon and Luzerne counties)
Nockamixon State Park (Bucks County)
Ralph Stover State Park (Bucks County)
Round Valley State Park (New Jersey)
Spruce Run State Park (New Jersey)
Stephens State Park (New Jersey)
Tobyhanna State Park (Monroe and Wayne counties)
Voorhees State Park (New Jersey)

References

External links

 

Historic districts in Northampton County, Pennsylvania
State parks of Pennsylvania
Protected areas established in 1959
Nature centers in Pennsylvania
Parks in Northampton County, Pennsylvania
Education in Northampton County, Pennsylvania
Buildings and structures in Northampton County, Pennsylvania
Tourist attractions in Northampton County, Pennsylvania
Historic districts on the National Register of Historic Places in Pennsylvania
National Register of Historic Places in Northampton County, Pennsylvania
Protected areas of Northampton County, Pennsylvania